Mohammed Abdul Aziz is a Ghanaian politician. He was the Member of Parliament for Mion constituency in the Northern Region of Ghana which he won in the 2016 Ghanaian parliamentary election.

References

Living people
Ghanaian Muslims
Year of birth missing (living people)
Ghanaian MPs 2017–2021
Ghanaian MPs 2021–2025
National Democratic Congress (Ghana) politicians